Eriphyle  (Ancient Greek: Ἐριφύλη Eriphȳla) was a figure in Greek mythology who, in exchange for the necklace of Harmonia (also called the necklace of Eriphyle) given to her by Polynices, persuaded her husband Amphiaraus to join the expedition of the Seven against Thebes. She was then slain by her son Alcmaeon. In Jean Racine's 1674 retelling of Iphigenia at Aulis, she is an orphan whose real name turns out to be Iphigenia as well; despite her many misdeeds, she rescues Iphigenia the daughter of Agamemnon.

Myths
Eriphyle, daughter of Talaus, was the mother of Alcmaeon and the wife of Amphiaraus. Eriphyle persuaded Amphiaraus to take part in the expedition of the Seven against Thebes, though she knew he would die.  She had been persuaded by Polynices, who offered her the necklace of Harmonia for her assistance.

Dying Amphiaraus charged his sons Alcmaeon and Amphilochus with avenging his death and, after Amphiaraus died, fulfilling the prophecy, Alcmaeon killed his mother.  He was pursued by the Erinyes as he fled across Greece, eventually reaching the court of King Phegeus, who gave him his daughter in marriage.  Exhausted, Alcmaeon asked an oracle how to assuage the Erinyes and was told that he needed to stop where the sun was not shining when he killed his mother.  That was at the mouth of the river Achelous, which had become silted up.  Achelous, the god of that river, offered him his daughter Callirrhoe in marriage if Alcmaeon would retrieve the necklace and clothes that Eriphyle had worn when she persuaded Amphiaraus to take part in the battle.  Alcmaeon had given these jewels to Phegeus, who had his sons kill Alcmaeon when he discovered Alcmaeon's plan: thus lest the curse be transmitted to a next generation it was dedicated to Aphrodite at Amathus in Cyprus.

Eriphyle is seen in Hades in Vergil's Aeneid, still bearing wounds inflicted by her son. She also plays a role in Statius's Thebaid, in which her desire to attain the necklace of Harmonia is one of the catalysts for the war between Argos and Thebes. In this version of the myth, however, Argia, Polynices's wife, persuades her husband to give the necklace to Eriphyle so that Amphiaraus will join the war effort.

Necklace

The Necklace of Harmonia was a gift to Cadmus when 
Zeus gave him to wife Harmonia, daughter of Aphrodite and Ares. And all the gods quitted the sky, and feasting in the Cadmea celebrated the marriage with hymns. Cadmus gave her a robe and the necklace wrought by Hephaestus, which some say was given to Cadmus by Hephaestus, but Pherecydes says that it was given by Europa, who had received it from Zeus.

A relic was being shown in Amathus in Cyprus, in the time of Pausanias (2nd century CE):
In Cyprus is a city Amathus, in which is an old sanctuary of Adonis and Aphrodite. Here they say is dedicated a necklace given originally to Harmonia, but called the necklace of Eriphyle, because it was the bribe she took to betray her husband. It was dedicated at Delphi by the sons of Phegeus (how they got it I have already related in my history of Arcadia), but it was carried off by the tyrants of Phocis.

The necklace that Pausanias was shown was of green stones with gold, which made him skeptical of its being the one mentioned by Homer (Odyssey xi.327), for he noted other occasions in the Odyssey where necklaces made of gold and stones mention the stones.

See also
 Jean Racine's Iphigénie 
 William Makepeace Thackeray's Vanity Fair
 Voltaire's Ériphyle

Notes

References
Pausanias, Description of Greece ix.41.2
Apollodorus, Biibliotheke iii.4.2

Women in Greek mythology
Characters in Book VI of the Aeneid
Argive characters in Greek mythology